Congregations of the Presbyterian Church in Ireland are grouped into 19 presbyteries throughout the island of Ireland. The stated officers within a presbytery are the moderator, who acts as chairman, and the clerk, who acts as secretary to the presbytery. Both the moderator and clerk are chosen from among the ministers and ruling elders under the presbytery’s jurisdiction. The Moderator is elected for a term of one year at the March meeting of the presbytery, whilst the clerk is appointed by the Presbytery and holds office at the pleasure of the court.

This page includes a list of all 19 presbyteries of the Presbyterian Church in Ireland and their constituent congregations.

Ards 
Ballyblack, Ballycrochan, Ballygilbert, Ballygrainey, Ballyholme, Ballywalter, Bangor - First, Bangor - St. Andrew’s, Bangor - Hamilton Road, Bangor - Trinity, Bangor - West, Carrowdore & Ballyfrenis, Cloughey, Conlig, Donaghadee - First, Donaghadee - Shore Street, Glastry, Greyabbey - Trinity, Groomsport, Helen’s Bay, Kilcooley, Kircubbin, Lisnabreen, Millisle & Ballycopeland, Newtownards - First, Newtownards - Second, Newtownards - Greenwell St., Newtownards - Movilla, Newtownards - Regent St., Newtownards - Scrabo, Newtownards - Strean, Portaferry, Portavogie.

Armagh
Ahorey, Armagh - First, Armagh - The Mall, Armaghbrague, Belville, Benburb, Caledon, Cladymore, Clare, Craigavon, Drumhillery, Drumminis, Keady - First, Keady - Second, Knappagh, Lislooney, Loughgall, Lurgan - First, Lurgan - Hill Street, Minterburn, Moy, Portadown - First, Portadown - Armagh Road, Redrock, Richhill, Tartaraghan, Tassagh, Vinecash, Waringstown.

Ballymena
Ahoghill - First, Ahoghill - Trinity, Ahoghill - Brookside, Ballymena - First, Ballymena - High Kirk, Ballymena - West Church, Ballymena - Wellington, Ballymena - Harryville, Ballymena - Ballyloughan, Ballymena - Ballykeel, Ballymena - Ballee, Broughshane - First, Broughshane - Second, Buckna, Cairnalbana, Carnlough/Cushendall, Churchtown, Clough, Cloughwater, Connor, Cullybackey - Cuningham Memorial, Eskylane, Glenarm, Glenwherry, Grange, Kells, Killymurris, Newtowncrommelin, Portglenone - First, Townhill, Rasharkin.

North Belfast
Abbey, Abbot's Cross, Alexandra, Ballygomartin, Ballyhenry, Ballysillan, Carnmoney, Crumlin Road, Eglinton, Glengormley, Immanuel, New Mossley, Newington, Rathcoole, Rosemary, Seaview, Sinclair Seamens, West Kirk, Whiteabbey, Whitehouse, Woodvale

South Belfast
Ballycairn, Belvoir, Cooke Centenary, Dunmurry, Finaghy - Lowe Memorial, Fisherwick, Fitzroy, Great Victoria Street, Kilmakee, Kinghan, Malone, May Street (Central Church), McCracken Memorial, Newtownbreda - St. John’s, Richview, Saintfield Road, Taughmonagh, Townsend Street, Windsor.

East Belfast
Belmont, Bloomfield, Castlereagh, Cregagh, Dundonald, Dundonald - Christ Church, Garnerville, Gilnahirk, Granshaw, Holywood - First, Holywood - High Street, Kirkpatrick Memorial, Knock, McQuiston Memorial, Mersey Street, Mountpottinger, Orangefield, Ravenhill, St. Andrew's, Stormont, Strand, Tullycarnet, Westbourne.

Carrickfergus
Ballycarry, Ballyclare, Ballylinney, Ballynure, Cairncastle, Carrickfergus - First, Carrickfergus - Joymount, Carrickfergus - Woodlands, Carrickfergus - Downshire, Greenisland, Islandmagee - First, Islandmagee - Second, Larne - First, Larne - Gardenmore, Larne - Craigy Hill, Loughmorne, Magheramorne, Raloo, Whitehead, Woodburn.

Coleraine and Limavady
Aghadowey, Ballyrashane, Ballywatt, Ballywillan, Balteagh, Banagher, Boveedy, Bovevagh, Castlerock, Coleraine - First, Coleraine - Terrace Row, Coleraine - New Row, Coleraine - Hazelbank, Coleraine - Ballysally, Crossgar, Derramore, Dunboe - First, Dunboe - Second, Dungiven, Drumachose, Garvagh - First, Garvagh - Main Street, Killaig, Kilrea - First, Kilrea - Second, Largy, Limavady - First, Limavady - Second, Macosquin, Magilligan, Moneydig, Myroe, Portrush, Portstewart, Portstewart - Burnside, Ringsend.

Derry and Donegal
Ballyarnett, Ballykelly, Ballylennon, Burt, Carndonagh, Carnone, Carrigart, Convoy, Crossroads, Cumber, Cumber - Upper, Derry - First, Derry - Carlisle Road, Derry - Ebrington, Derry - Kilfennan, Derry - Waterside, Donagheady, Donegal, Donemana, Donoughmore, Dunfanaghy, Fahan, Fannet, Faughanvale, Glendermott, Gortnessy, Greenbank, Inch, Kilmacrennan, Knowehead, Leckpatrick, Letterkenny - Trinity, Magheramason, Malin, Milford, Monreagh, Moville, Newtowncunningham, Ramelton, Raphoe & Ballindrait, Rathmullan, Ray, St. Johnston, Strabane, Stranorlar, Trenta.

Down
Ardglass, Ballygowan, Ballynahinch - First, Ballynahinch - Edengrove, Boardmills - Trinity, Carryduff, Clough, Comber - First, Comber - Second, Downpatrick, Killinchy, Killyleagh - First, Killyleagh - Second, Kilmore, Crossgar - Lissara, Magherahamlet, Raffrey, Saintfield - First, Saintfield - Second, Seaforde, Spa.

Dromore
Anahilt, Ballinderry, Cargycreevy, Dromara - First, Dromara - Second, Dromore - First, Dromore - Banbridge Road, Drumbo, Drumlough, Harmony Hill, Hillhall, Hillsborough, Legacurry, Lisburn - First, Lisburn - Railway Street, Lisburn - Sloan Street, Lisburn - St. Columba's, Lisburn - Elmwood, Loughaghery, Magheragall, Maze, Moira.

Dublin/Munster
Aghada, Arklow, Athy, Blackrock - St. Andrew's, Bray, Cahir, Carlow, Corboy, Cork - Trinity, Drogheda, Dublin - Abbey, Dublin - Adelaide Road, Dublin - Clontarf & Scots, Dublin - Rathgar (Christ Church), Dun Laoghaire, Donabate, Enniscorthy,  Fermoy, Galway, Greystones, Howth & Malahide, Kilkenny, Lucan, Maynooth, Mullingar, Naas, Tullamore, Wexford.

Iveagh
Anaghclone, Ballydown, Ballyroney, Banbridge - Bannside, Banbridge - Scarva Street, Castlewellan, Clonduff, Donacloney, Donaghmore, Drumgooland, Drumlee, Garvaghy, Gilford, Glascar, Hilltown, Katesbridge, Kilkinamurry, Leitrim, Loughbrickland, Magherally, Newcastle, Newmills, Rathfriland - First, Rathfriland - Second & Third, Scarva, Tandragee, Tullylish.

Monaghan
Bailieborough - First, Bailieborough - Trinity, Ballina, Ballyalbany, Ballybay - First, Ballybay - Second, Ballyhobridge, Ballymote, Bellasis, Castleblayney - First, Cavan, Clones, Clontibret, Cootehill, Corraneary, Corvalley, Drum, Drumkeen, Drumkeeran, Dundalk, Ervey, Frankford, Glennan, Kells, Killala, Killeshandra, Kilmount, Middletown, Monaghan - First, Newbliss, Rockcorry, Sligo, Smithborough, Stonebridge.

Newry
Annalong, Bessbrook, Brookvale, Clarkesbridge & First Newtownnhamilton, Creggan, Cremore, Drumbanangher - First & Jerrettspass, Fourtowns, Garmany's Grove, Kilkeel, Kilkeel - Mourne, Markethill, McKelvey's Grove, Mountnorris, Newry - First (Sandys Street), Newry - Downshire Road, Newtownhamilton - Second, Poyntzpass, Rostrevor, Ryans, Tullyallen, Tyrone's Ditches, Warrenpoint.

Omagh
Ardstraw, Aughentaine, Aughnacloy, Badoney, Ballygawley, Ballymagrane, Ballynahatty & Creevan, Ballyreagh, Castlederg - First, Castlederg - Second, Cavanaleck, Clogher, Clogherney, Corrick, Dromore, Drumlegagh, Drumquin, Douglas, Edenderry, Enniskillen, Fintona, Gillygooley, Glenelly, Glenhoy, Gortin, Irvinestown, Killeter, Lisbellaw, Lisnaskea, Maguiresbridge, Mountjoy, Newtownbutler, Newtownstewart, Omagh - First, Omagh - Trinity, Pettigo, Seskinore, Sion, Sixmilecross, Tempo, Urney.

Route
Armoy, Ballycastle, Ballymoney - First, Ballymoney - Trinity, Ballymoney - St. James's, Ballyweaney, Bushmills, Bushvale, Croaghmore, Dervock, Dromore, Drumreagh, Dunluce, Dunloy, Finvoy, Garryduff, Kilraughts - First, Mosside, Ramoan, Roseyards, Toberdoney, Toberkeigh.

Templepatrick
Antrim - First, Antrim - High Street, Antrim - Greystone Road, Ballyeaston - First, Ballyeaston - Second, Crumlin, Donegore - First, Donegore - Second, Dundrod, Duneane, Hydepark, Kilbride, Killead, Loanends, Lylehill, Muckamore, Randalstown - First, Randalstown - Old Congregation, Randalstown - Second, Templepatrick.

Tyrone
Albany, Ballygoney, Bellaghy, Brigh, Carland, Castlecaulfield, Castledawson, Claggan, Clonaneese Lower, Clonaneese Upper, Coagh, Cookstown - First, Cookstown - Molesworth Street, Culnady, Curran, Draperstown, Dungannon, Eglish, Knockcloghrim, Lecumpher, Maghera, Magherafelt - First, Magherafelt - Union Road, Moneymore - First, Moneymore - Second, Newmills, Orritor, Pomeroy, Saltersland, Sandholes, Stewartstown, Swatragh, Tobermore.

Presbyterian Church in Ireland
Presbyteries
Presbyterianism in the United Kingdom
Presbyterianism in the Republic of Ireland